That's It, That's All is a 2008 documentary film about snowboarding written by Brain Farm Productions and directed by Curt Morgan. It is the predecessor to The Art of Flight film, released on DVD on November 14, 2008. The film presents the life of an influential snowboarder Travis Rice and his crew, while facing different challenges in the professional world of sport.

Cast
 Travis Rice
 Jake Blauvelt
 Kyle Clancy	
 Terje Håkonsen
 Bryan Iguchi
 John Jackson
 Jeremy Jones
 Danny Kass
 Scotty Lago
 Mark Landvik
 Pat Moore
 Nicolas Müller

Locations
 Alaska, USA
 British Columbia, Canada
 Jackson, Wyoming, USA
 Park City, Utah, USA
 Tokyo, Japan
 Munich, Germany
 New Zealand
 San Francisco, California, USA
 Valdez, Alaska, USA

Production

The film's action takes place in different places around the world such as: New Zealand, Valdez, B.C., Munich, Tokyo, Jackson Hole and Japan, including a great number of landscapes, mostly captured by a helicopter's crane camera.

The making of the film took around two years and was entirely produced as high definition documentary with high values.

Awards
 Audience Award at Newport Beach Film Festival 2009

References

External links
 
 That's It, That's all official film site
 That's It, That's all Facebook page

American sports documentary films
Snowboarding films
Films shot in New Zealand
Films shot in British Columbia
Films shot in Munich
Films shot in Tokyo
Films shot in Wyoming
2000s English-language films
2000s American films